The men's bantamweight event was part of the boxing programme at the 1984 Summer Olympics. The weight class allowed boxers of up to 54 kilograms to compete. The competition was held from 30 July to 11 August 1984. 35 boxers from 35 nations competed.

Medalists

Results
The following boxers took part in the event:

First round
 Jarmo Eskelinen (FIN) def. Yao Gaitor (TOG), 5:0
 Pedro Nolasco (DOM) def. Ljubiša Simič (YUG), 4:1
 John Siryakibbe (UGA) def. Manuel Vilchez (VEN), 3:2

Second round
 Pedro Ruben Decima (ARG) def. Tshoza Mukuta (ZAI), 5:0
 Çemal Öner (TUR) def. Bararg Bahtohe (IVC), 4:1
 Hiroaki Takami (JPN) def. Gamal El-Komy (EGY), 4:1
 Dale Walters (CAN) def. Mustapha Kouchane (ALG), 5:0
 Joe Orewa (NGR) def. Wanchai Pongsri (THA), KO-2
 Héctor López (MEX) def. Johny Asadoma (INA), KO-3
 Ndaba Dube (ZIM) def. Amon Neequaye (GHA), 5:0
 Louis Gomis (FRA) def. Stefan Gertel (FRG), AB-2
 Robinson Pitalua (COL) def. Hugh Dyer (BLZ), RSC-2
 Babar Ali Khan (PAK) def. Firmin Abissi (BEN), 5:0
 Star Zulu (ZAM) def. Gustavo Cruz (NIC), 5:0
 Maurizio Stecca (ITA) def. Philip Sutcliffe (IRL), 5:0
 Moon Sung-Kil (KOR) def. John Hyland (GBR), AB-3
 Robert Shannon (USA) def. Sammy Mwangi (KEN), 5:0
 Juan Molina (PUR) def. Jarmo Eskelinen (FIN), 5:0
 Pedro Nolasco (DOM) def. John Siryakibbe (UGA), 5:0

Third round
 Pedro Ruben Decima (ARG) def. Çemal Öner (TUR), 4:1
 Dale Walters (CAN) def. Hiroaki Takami (JPN), 5:0
 Héctor López (MEX) def. Joe Orewa (NGR), 4:1
 Ndaba Dube (ZIM) def. Louis Gomis (FRA), 5:0
 Robinson Pitalua (COL) def. Babar Ali Khan (PAK), 5:0
 Maurizio Stecca (ITA) def. Star Zulu (ZAM), 5:0
 Moon Sung-Kil (KOR) def. Robert Shannon (USA), RSC-3
 Pedro Nolasco (DOM) def. Juan Molina (PUR), 3:2

Quarterfinals
 Dale Walters (CAN) def. Pedro Ruben Decima (ARG), 5:0
 Héctor López (MEX) def. Ndaba Dube (ZIM), 5:0
 Maurizio Stecca (ITA) def. Robinson Pitalua (COL), 5:0
 Pedro Nolasco (DOM) def. Moon Sung-Kil (KOR), RSC-1

Semifinals
 Héctor López (MEX) def. Dale Walters (CAN), 5:0
 Maurizio Stecca (ITA) def. Pedro Nolasco (DOM), 5:0

Final
 Maurizio Stecca (ITA) def. Héctor López (MEX), 4:1

References

Bantamweight